The Seidelmann 245 is an American trailerable sailboat that was designed by Bob Seidelmann as a cruiser and first built in 1981. The designer was well known as a champion one design sailor and also as a sailmaker.

Production
The design was built by Seidelmann Yachts in Berlin, New Jersey in the United States between 1981 and 1984, but it is now out of production.

Design
The Seidelmann 245 is a recreational keelboat, built predominantly of fiberglass, with wood trim and aluminum spars. The mast is deck-stepped, with a tabernacle. It has a 7/8 fractional sloop rig, a raked stem, a vertical transom, a transom-hung rudder controlled by a tiller and a fixed stub keel with a centerboard. It displaces  and carries  of ballast.

The boat is normally fitted with a small outboard motor for docking and maneuvering.

The accommodations include a "V"-berth forward and two cabin berths, with stowage underneath them. The galley is split, with the single-burner stove to starboard and the sink on the port side. The chemical head has a privacy door. Ventilation includes a forward hatch and two opening portlights. An anchor locker is located in the bow.

The cockpit includes two jib winches, while a halyard winch is deck-mounted. The jib sheets are controlled though track-mounted blocks. The halyards, mainsail outhaul and reefing lines are internally-run.

The design has a PHRF racing average handicap of 210 with a high of 204 and low of 216.

See also
List of sailing boat types

Similar sailboats
Achilles 24
Atlantic City catboat
Balboa 24
C&C 24
Challenger 24
Columbia 24
Dana 24
Islander 24
Islander 24 Bahama
J/24
MacGregor 24
Mirage 24
Northern 1/4 Ton
Nutmeg 24
San Juan 24
Shark 24
Tonic 23

References

Keelboats
1980s sailboat type designs
Sailing yachts
Trailer sailers
Sailboat type designs by Bob Seidelmann
Sailboat types built by Seidelmann Yachts